Balkhash District is a district of Almaty Region in Kazakhstan. The administrative center of the district is the selo of Bakanas. Population:

Geography
Balkhash region is located in the northwestern part of Almaty Region. It occupies the territory from the Malaysarinsky ridges in the southeast to the southern coast of the lake  Balkhash, in the north - part of the desert Saryesik-Atyrau Desert, in the west and south - the sands of Taukum. The relief is flat. The climate is continental. Winter is cold, summer is hot and dry. The average temperatures in January are -13-15°C, in July 24°C. The average annual amount of precipitation is 100-150 mm. The largest river is Ili with a length of 1001 km. The Akdala irrigation system was laid along its right bank.

References

Districts of Kazakhstan
Almaty Region